Joakim Nordström (born 25 February 1992) is a Swedish professional ice hockey centre who is currently playing with HC Davos of the National League (NL). He won the World Championships in 2017 with Sweden and the Stanley Cup with the Chicago Blackhawks in 2015. He was selected by the Chicago Blackhawks in the third round, 90th overall in the 2010 NHL Entry Draft. He is the brother of Dennis Nordström.

Playing career
Nordström made his SHL debut on 23 September 2010 against Södertälje SK. He signed a three-year, entry-level contract with the Blackhawks on 29 May 2012, but remained with AIK for the 2012–13 season. Nordström made his NHL debut with the Blackhawks on 1 October 2013. He scored his first NHL goal on 11 October 2013 against Kevin Poulin of the New York Islanders. Nordström was sent down to the Rockford IceHogs of the AHL on 21 October 2013, where he played before being recalled back to the Blackhawks on 2 April 2014.

In the 2014–15 season with the IceHogs, Nordström was the captain of the IceHogs though he played 38 games with the Blackhawks, including three in the playoffs, and was part of the team that won the Stanley Cup in 2015.

On 13 March 2015, Nordström was suspended for two games for boarding against Arizona Coyotes defenseman Oliver Ekman-Larsson in a game the previous night.

Approaching the 2015–16 season, on 11 September 2015, he was traded by the Blackhawks to the Carolina Hurricanes with Kris Versteeg as a salary-cutting measure.

After three seasons within the Hurricanes organization, Nordström left as a free agent to sign a two-year, $2 million contract with the Boston Bruins on 1 July 2018. Nordström's first Bruins goal came on 12 October 2018, as the third Bruins goal en route to a 4–1 home ice victory against the Edmonton Oilers.

At the conclusion of his contract with the Bruins, Nordström left to sign a one-year, $700,000 contract with his fourth NHL club, the Calgary Flames, on 19 October 2020.

Following his eighth season in the NHL, unable to help the Flames qualify for the playoffs, Nordström left North America as a free agent and signed a one-year contract with Russian club, CSKA Moscow of the Kontinental Hockey League (KHL), on 4 June 2021. In the 2021–22 season, in a checking-line role Nordström registered three goals and 14 points through 27 regular season games. He made two playoff appearances before terminating his contract with CSKA on 4 March 2022 due to the Russian invasion of Ukraine.

As a free agent, Nordström moved to the Swiss National League, signing a two-year contract with HC Davos on 2 June 2022.

Career statistics

Regular season and playoffs

International

Awards and honours

References

External links

1992 births
AIK IF players
Almtuna IS players
Boston Bruins players
Calgary Flames players
Carolina Hurricanes players
Charlotte Checkers (2010–) players
Chicago Blackhawks draft picks
Chicago Blackhawks players
HC CSKA Moscow players
HC Davos players
Living people
Ice hockey players at the 2022 Winter Olympics
Olympic ice hockey players of Sweden
Rockford IceHogs (AHL) players
Ice hockey people from Stockholm
Stanley Cup champions
Swedish expatriate ice hockey players in the United States
Swedish ice hockey centres